Yu Cheng-yu (born 2 April 1995) is a Taiwanese tennis player.

Yu has a career high ATP singles ranking of 531 achieved on 14 August 2017. He also has a career high ATP doubles ranking of 671 achieved on 17 April 2017.

Yu represents Chinese Taipei at the Davis Cup, where he has a W/L record of 0–1.

References

External links

1995 births
Living people
Taiwanese male tennis players
Sportspeople from Taipei